Ian Maclaren (1 May 1875 – 10 April 1952) was an English stage and film actor. He acted in more than thirty films in Hollywood including the 1930 war film Journey's End. Towards the end of his film career he was generally cast in small, uncredited parts.

Partial filmography

 Under the Red Robe (1923) - King Louis XIII
 Yolanda (1924) - Campo Basse
 Monsieur Beaucaire (1924) - Duke of Winterset
 Journey's End (1930) - Lt. Osborne
 Men on Call (1930) - Eric (uncredited)
 Body and Soul (1931) - General Trafford-Jones
 The Conquering Horde (1931) - Marvin Fletcher
 Prestige (1931) - Colonel Du Flos
 Merry-Go-Round (1932) - Chief Frank Hyers
 Cleopatra (1934) - Cassius
 Les Misérables (1935) - Head Gardener
 False Faces (1935) - Reconstructionist (uncredited)
 The Last of the Mohicans (1936) - William Pitt
 The House of Secrets (1936) - Commissioner Cross
 The Prince and the Pauper (1937) - Second Doctor
 Parnell (1937) - House of Commons Member (uncredited)
 The Prisoner of Zenda (1937) - Cardinal (uncredited)
 Lancer Spy (1937) - Plainclothesman (uncredited)
 The Trial of Portia Merriman (1937) - Father Caslez
 Invisible Enemy (1938) - Sir Joshua Longstreet
 Kidnapped (1938) - Minister (uncredited)
 The Young in Heart (1938) - Doctor (uncredited)
 If I Were King (1938) - Beggar (uncredited)
 Little Orphan Annie (1938) - Soo Long
 The Hound of the Baskervilles (1939) - Sir Charles
 The Man in the Iron Mask (1939) - Valet de Chambre (uncredited)
 The Man They Could Not Hang (1939) - Priest (uncredited)
 The Doctor Takes a Wife (1940) - Professor (uncredited)
 When the Daltons Rode (1940) - Crony #2 (uncredited)
 A Little Bit of Heaven (1940) - Second Cronie (uncredited)
 The Common Touch (1941) - Harmonica Player
 The Grand Escapade (1947) - Harmonica Player (final film role)

Bibliography
 Goble, Alan. The Complete Index to Literary Sources in Film. Walter de Gruyter, 1999.

Notes

External links

1875 births
1952 deaths
British male stage actors
British male film actors
British emigrants to the United States
Male actors from Devon
People from North Devon (district)